The women's 100 metres event at the 1987 Summer Universiade was held at the Stadion Maksimir in Zagreb on 13 and 14 July 1987.

Medalists

Results

Heats
Held on 13 July

Wind:Heat 6: -0.2 m/s

Semifinals
Held on 14 July

Final
Held on 14 July

Wind: +0.5 m/s

References

Athletics at the 1987 Summer Universiade
1987